HMS Forward is a Royal Naval Reserve unit located in Birmingham, England, close to St. Andrews football stadium. It has a crew of nearly 100 naval and marine reservists, in addition to a handful of full-time staff. The Birmingham University Royal Naval Unit, the Defence Technical Undergraduate Scheme 'Taurus Squadron' and a detachment of the Royal Marine Reserves Merseyside are also located on the site. The ship is particularly unusual in that it is situated 80 miles from the sea.

History

The base originated on a different site during the Second World War, and was originally known as the regional Naval Communications Training Centre. On 1 October 1984, the centre became a commissioned ship - a stone frigate - known as HMS Forward. In early 1985, the unit moved to a former industrial unit on Sampson Rd North which, on 28 January 1986, was officially opened by The Princess Royal. The unit once again moved in April 1999, this time to a new purpose-built building. Once again the official opening was performed by The Princess Royal. The ship acquired its name from the motto of the City of Birmingham - Forward.

Awards and noted events

In 2004, the ship was granted the Freedom of the City of Birmingham, from John Alden, Lord Mayor of Birmingham.

In 2007, a team from the ship, led by new recruit Jules Morgan, rescued a man with hypothermia from Snowdon in driving hail.

The ship became more famous in recent years when it produced a winner of The Sun Military Awards, Able Seaman Grandison, who won the national award for 'Best Reservist'. Grandison is a taxi-driver in Sandwell, but left his work and contracts to deploy to the Indian Ocean as part of a team to provide armed protection against piracy to RFA Wave Knight. He was later promoted to Leading Hand.

Current tasks
Being the only large naval presence in the West Midlands, Forward is called upon to act in ceremonial duties and parades, and recently supplied contingents for the Birmingham Trafalgar Day, Remembrance Day, and Armed Forces Day parades.

References

External links
 Official page

Royal Navy shore establishments
Royal Navy bases in England
Military installations established in 1984
Buildings and structures in Birmingham, West Midlands